The 1922–23 Connecticut Aggies men's basketball team represented Connecticut Agricultural College, now the University of Connecticut, in the 1922–23 collegiate men's basketball season. The Aggies completed the season with an 8–7 overall record. The Aggies were members of the Athletic League of New England State Colleges, where they ended the season with a 2–1 record. The Aggies played their home games at Hawley Armory in Storrs, Connecticut, and were led by second-year head coach J. Wilder Tasker and first-year head coach Roy J. Guyer.

Schedule 

|-
!colspan=12 style=""| Regular Season

Schedule Source:

References 

UConn Huskies men's basketball seasons
Connecticut
1922 in sports in Connecticut
1923 in sports in Connecticut